William Rae Macdonald (1843 – 1923) was a Scottish officer of arms.

Between 1898 and 1907, Macdonald was Carrick Pursuivant of the Court of the Lord Lyon. In 1909 he was appointed Albany Herald. 

He was an actuary, antiquarian and mathematician, and contributed articles to the Dictionary of National Biography.

References

1843 births
1923 deaths
Contributors to the Dictionary of National Biography
Scottish antiquarians
Scottish officers of arms
Scottish writers